The idea of dual messiahs is the belief that there are either two messiahs or one messiah assuming the role of two. Later-Judaism talks about two messiahs — sons respectively of Joseph and of David

See also
Messiah ben David
Messiah ben Joseph

References

Dead Sea Scrolls
+